The Surgeon's Knife is a 1957 British crime film directed by Gordon Parry and starring Donald Houston, Adrienne Corri and Lyndon Brook. It is an adaptation of the 1940 novel The Wicked Flee by Anne Hocking.

Synopsis
When his patient dies during an operation, a surgeon resorts to murder to cover up his negligence.

Cast
 Donald Houston as Doctor Alex Waring
 Adrienne Corri as Laura Shelton
 Lyndon Brook as Doctor Ian Breck
 Jean Cadell as Henrietta Stevens
 Sydney Tafler as Doctor Hearne
 Mervyn Johns as Mr. Waring
 Marie Ney as Matron Fiske
 Ronald Adam as Major Tilling
 John Welsh as Inspector Austen
 Beatrice Varley as Mrs. Waring
 Noel Hood as Sister Slater
 André van Gyseghem as Mr. Dodds
 Frank Forsyth as Anaesthetist
 Tom Bowman as Surgeon
 Susan Westerby as Miss Jenner
 Betty Shale as Garsten

Critical reception
TV Guide rated the film 2/5 stars, noting a "Standard melodrama without enough suspense to be terrifying."

References

External links
 

1957 films
1957 crime films
British black-and-white films
Films about surgeons
Films directed by Gordon Parry
British crime films
Films based on British novels
1950s English-language films
1950s British films